Arabic coffee is a version of the brewed coffee of Coffea arabica beans. Most Arab countries throughout the Middle East have developed distinct methods for brewing and preparing coffee. Cardamom is an often-added spice, but it can alternatively be served plain or with sugar.

There are several different styles to brewing the coffee depending on the preference of the drinker. Some methods keep the coffee light whereas others can make it dark. Arabic coffee is bitter, and typically no sugar is added. It is usually served in a small cup that is adorned with a decorative pattern, known as a finjān. Culturally, Arabic coffee is served during family gatherings or when receiving guests.

Arabic coffee is ingrained within Middle Eastern and Arab culture and tradition, and is the most popular form of coffee brewed in the Middle East. It originated in the Middle East, beginning in Yemen and eventually travelling to Mecca (Hejaz), Egypt, the Levant, and then, in the mid-16th century, to Turkey and from there to Europe where coffee eventually became popular as well. Arabic coffee is an Intangible Cultural Heritage of Arab states confirmed by UNESCO.

Etymology 

The word "coffee" entered the English language in 1582 via the Dutch koffie, borrowed from the Ottoman Turkish kahve, in turn borrowed from the Arabic قَهْوَة (qahwa, “coffee, a brew”). The word qahwah may have originally referred to the drink's reputation as an appetite suppressant from the word qahiya.  The name qahwah is not used for the berry or plant (the products of the region), which are known in Arabic as bunn.  Semitic had a root qhh "dark color", which became a natural designation for the beverage.  According to this analysis, the feminine form qahwah (also meaning "dark in color, dull(ing), dry, sour") also had the meaning of wine, which was also often dark in color.

History 
The earliest credible evidence of either coffee drinking or knowledge of the coffee tree appears as the legend of an Ethiopian goatherd named Kaldi who noticed a change in the behavior of his goats when they ate the berries of the coffee trees.  Initially, the coffee beans were chewed up rather than ground, roasted and turned into a liquid. Some historians believe coffee was introduced to the Arabian peninsula circa 675 AD. It is certain that by the middle of the 15th century, coffee was in use in Yemen's Sufi monasteries. Sufis used it to keep themselves alert during their nighttime devotions. A translation of Al-Jaziri's manuscript traces the spread of coffee from Arabia Felix (the present day Yemen) northward to Mecca and Medina, and then to the larger cities of Cairo, Damascus, Baghdad, and Constantinople. In 1511, it was forbidden for its stimulating effect by conservative, orthodox imams at a theological court in Mecca. However, these bans were to be overturned in 1524 by an order of the Ottoman Turkish Sultan Suleiman I, with Grand Mufti Mehmet Ebussuud el-İmadi issuing a fatwa allowing the consumption of coffee. In Cairo, Egypt, a similar ban was instituted in 1532, and the coffeehouses and warehouses containing coffee beans were sacked.

Preparation 

Traditionally, it is roasted on the premises (at home or for special occasions), ground, brewed and served in front of guests. It is often served with dates, dried fruit, candied fruit or nuts. Arabic coffee is defined by the method of preparation and flavors, rather than the type of roast beans. Arabic coffee is boiled coffee that is not filtered, made black. Sugar is not typically added, but if so, it can be added during preparation or when serving. It is served in a small delicate cup without handles, called finjān. Sometimes, the coffee is moved to a larger and more beautiful pour pitcher to serve in front of the guests, called Dallah. Often, though, the host prepares coffee in the kitchen and highlights a tray of small cups of coffee. Unlike Turkish coffee, traditional Arabic coffee, with its roots in Bedouin tradition, is usually unsweetened (qahwah saada), but sugar can be added depending on the preference of drinker. However, this coffee is never sweet syrup, but rather strong and bitter. To make up for the bitter flavor, coffee is usually served with something sweetdates are a traditional accompanimentand other desserts are often served along with a tray of coffee cups.

Arabian Peninsula 

Arabs in the Arabian Peninsula are also creative in the way they prepare coffee. Coffee is different from that in Egypt and Levant in terms of bitterness and the type of cups the coffee is served in. This brewing method is common in Najd and Hejaz, and sometimes other spices like saffron (to give it a golden color), cardamom, cloves, and cinnamon. Arabic coffee in Najd and Hejaz takes a golden color, while in North Arabia a type of Arabic coffee known as qahwah shamālia  (literally means Northern Coffee) it looks darker in color, because roasting the coffee beans takes a bit longer. Northern coffee is also known as Bedouin coffee in Jordan. Some people add a little-evaporated milk to slightly alter its color; however, this is rare. It is prepared in and served from a special coffee pot called dallah; more commonly used is the coffee pot called cezve (also called rikwah or kanaka) and the coffee cups are small with no handle called fenjan. The portions are small, covering just the bottom of the cup. It is served in homes, and in good restaurants by specially clad waiters called gahwaji, and it is almost always accompanied with dates. It is always offered with the compliments of the house.

Levant 
The hot beverage that Palestinians consume is coffeeserved in the morning and throughout the day. The coffee of choice is usually Arabic coffee. Arabic coffee is similar to Turkish coffee, but the former is spiced with cardamom and is usually unsweetened. Among Bedouins and most other Arabs throughout the region of Palestine, bitter coffee, known as qahwah sadah (Lit. plain coffee), was a symbol of hospitality. Pouring the drink was ceremonial; it would involve the host or his eldest son moving clockwise among guestswho were judged by age and statuspouring coffee into tiny cups from a brass pot. It was considered "polite" for guests to accept only three cups of coffee and then end their last cup by saying daymen, meaning "always", but intending to mean "may you always have the means to serve coffee".

In Lebanon, the coffee is prepared in a long-handled coffee pot called a "rakwe". The coffee is then poured directly from the "rakwe" into a small cup that is usually adorned with a decorative pattern, known as a finjān. The finjān has a capacity of 60–90 ml (2–3 oz fl). Lebanese coffee is traditionally strong and black and is similar to the coffee of other Middle Eastern countries. However it differs in its beans and roast: the blonde and dark beans are mixed together and it is ground into a very fine powder. It is often joked that a Lebanese person who does not drink coffee is in danger of losing their nationality.

Arabic coffee is much more than just a drink in Jordanit is a traditional sign of respect and a way to bring people together. Black, cardamom-flavored Arabic coffee, also known as qahwah sādah (welcome coffee), deeply ingrained in Jordanian culture. Providing coffee (and tea) to guests is a large part of the intimate hospitality of the Hashemite Kingdom.

Morocco 
While the national drink of Morocco is gunpowder green tea brewed with fresh mint and espresso is very popular, Arabic coffee is also widely consumed, especially on formal occasions. It is often made with the purpose of conducting a business deal and welcoming someone into one's home for the first time, and frequently served at weddings and on important occasions.

Cultivation 

Much of the popularization of coffee is due to its cultivation in the Arab world, beginning in what is now Yemen, by Sufi monks in the 15th century. Through thousands of Arabs pilgrimaging to Mecca, the enjoyment and harvesting of coffee, or the "wine of Araby" spread to other Arab countries (e.g. Egypt, Syria) and eventually to a majority of the world through the 16th century. Coffee, in addition to being essential in the home, became a major part of social life. Coffeehouses, qahwa قَهوة in Modern Standard Arabic, became "Schools of the Wise" as they developed into places of intellectual discussion, in addition to centers of relaxation and comradery.

Coffeehouse 

Coffeehouse culture began in the Arab world, and eventually spread to other areas of the world and blended with the local culture. Traditional Arab coffeehouses are places where mostly men meet to socialize over games, coffee, and water pipes (shisha or argille). Depending on where the coffeehouse is, its specialty differs. In Maghreb, green tea is served with mint or coffee is served Arab and/or European style. Arabic coffee, or Turkish coffee, is made in Egypt and the Levant countries. Arabic coffee is a very small amount of dark coffee boiled in a pot and presented in a demitasse cup. Particularly in Egypt, coffee is served mazbuuta, which means the amount of sugar will be "just right", about one teaspoon per cup. However, in the Arabian Peninsula, Arabic coffee is roasted in such a way that the coffee is almost clear. In all of the Arab world, it is traditional for the host to refill the guest's cup until politely signaled that the guest is finished.

Served 

Arabic coffee is usually served just a few centiliters at a time. The guest drinks it and if he wishes, he will gesture to the waiter not to pour any more. Otherwise, the host/waiter will continue to serve another few centilitres at a time until the guest indicates he has had enough. The most common practice is to drink only one cup since serving coffee serves as a ceremonial act of kindness and hospitality. Sometimes people also drink larger volumes during conversations.

Customs 
The cups are normally only filled partway, and the custom is to drink three cups. Arabic coffee has a prominent place in traditional Arab holidays and special events such as Ramadan and Eid.

Fortune-telling 
Arabic coffee reading, is similar to tea-leaf reading; the client is asked to consume strong fresh Arabic coffee leaving approximately a teaspoon of liquid in the cup. The cup is then inverted onto a saucer to allowing the residual liquid to drain away and dry up. The reader will then interpret the patterns formed by the thick residue on the inside of the cup looking for symbols and letters.

Funeral 
Arabic funerals gather families and extended relatives, who drink bitter and unsweetened coffee and recount the life and characteristics of the deceased. The men and women gather separately, and it has become very fashionable to employ very presentable women whose only job is to serve coffee all day to the women. Male waiters serve the men. Arab Muslims and Christians share this tradition.

Nutrition facts 
A small cup of Arabic coffee has almost no calories or fat. It contains a small amount of protein.

See also
Arabic tea
Arab cuisine
Coffee In the Islamicate Empires
Home roasting coffee
Green coffee
Turkish coffee

References

Further reading
 
 

Arabic drinks
Arab culture
Yemeni cuisine
Saudi Arabian cuisine
Omani cuisine
Levantine cuisine
Palestinian cuisine
Lebanese cuisine
Syrian cuisine
Jordanian cuisine
Iraqi cuisine
Qatari cuisine
Coffee preparation
Arab inventions